Walther Frederick Goebel (December 24, 1899 – November 1, 1993) was an American immunologist and an organic chemist, a member of the National Academy of Sciences.

Goebel was known for his research of polysaccharides.

Awards and distinctions 
 member of the National Academy of Sciences
 honorary degrees from Rockefeller University in 1978 and Middlebury College in 1959

References 

1899 births
1993 deaths
American immunologists
20th-century American chemists
Members of the United States National Academy of Sciences